Okhla landfill is a dumping ground in Okhla, Delhi. Spread across an area of 40 acres, the site was commissioned in 1996 for the use of South Delhi Municipal Corporation (SDMC). Of the 3,500 tonnes of waste collected by SDMC everyday, 1,200 tonnes were being dumped in the Okhla Landfill despite the site was declared exhausted in 2010. After reaching a height of 55 meters, thrice the permissible limit, the site was finally decommissioned in 2018. The civic agency now aims to complete the remediation of the Okhla landfill within one-and-a-half years to convert it into a green cover.

See also
 Bhalswa landfill
 Mavallipura

References

Landfills in India
Delhi